Darbekeh (also Romanized as Darbakeh, Derbekeh, and Derebkeh; also known as Darībekeh, Derīkeh, and Dripka) is a village in Lahijan Rural District of the Central District of Piranshahr County, West Azerbaijan province, Iran. At the 2006 National Census, its population was 1,493 in 272 households. The following census in 2011 counted 1,788 people in 433 households. The latest census in 2016 showed a population of 2,007 people in 498 households; it was the largest village in its rural district.

References 

Piranshahr County

Populated places in West Azerbaijan Province

Populated places in Piranshahr County